A sweep in athletics is when one team wins all available medals in a single event in a sporting event. At the highest level, that would be when one nation wins all the medals in an athletics event at the World Championships in Athletics. In athletics the maximum number of entrants from a single country in most events is three, allowing in theory for athletes from the same country to finish in all three top places.

Men
Carl Lewis has been a part of four American sweeps.  Kenya has swept the 3000 metres steeplechase three times, with Ezekiel Kemboi and Brimin Kipruto a part of two of them.

Women
Sweeps have only occurred eleven times in women's events. The 10,000 metres is the only event to have had three occurrences, in 2001, 2005 and 2011. Ethiopia had most sweeps, at four.  Tirunesh Dibaba and her sister Ejegayehu Dibaba were both a part of two of those sweeps, another sister Genzebe Dibaba and cousin Derartu Tulu gave the family participation in all four Ethiopian sweeps.  Tirunesh's husband, Sileshi Sihine, was a part of Ethiopia's men's sweep.

See also
 List of medal sweeps in Olympic athletics

Footnotes

References

World Championships medal sweeps
World Athletics Championships